Ugoszcz  is a village in Gmina Studzienice, Bytów County, Pomeranian Voivodeship, in northern Poland.

It has a population of 740.

History
In 1885, the village had a population of 717.

In 1939, the Germans arrested local Polish activists and teachers, and expelled the local Polish organist.

From 1975 to 1998 the village was in Słupsk Voivodeship.

References

Map of the Gmina Studzienice

Ugoszcz